Filter (stylized as FILTER) was a seasonal, off-beat entertainment magazine on American music which was founded in the summer of 2002. It featured commentary and photos of up-and-coming musicians and filmmakers ranging from actors to writer-directors. Each season's issue (winter, spring, summer, fall, and holiday) highlighted a reasonably well-known cover artist while also taking a look at smaller artists under the heading "Getting to Know". The magazine also included reviews of forthcoming albums and DVDs.

With the motto "Good music will prevail", the publication aimed to bring indie music to the forefront through its reporting while also highlighting established artists in long-form interviews. The magazine used to contain a "PSSST!" compilation with each issue.

FILTER was published by Alan Miller and Alan Sartirana. Its editor-in-chief was Pat McGuire, its associate editor was Breanna Murphy, and its layout designer was Melissa Simonian.

FILTER also had a marketing arm which operated independently of the print publication. The magazine started a seasonal festival Culture Collide, now produced by founder Alan Miller and COLLiDE after Miller and Sartirana parted ways amicably in 2014, with Sartirana, McGuire, and Simonian going on with much of the FILTER staff to found FLOOD Magazine, a quarterly entertainment publication.

References

External links
 Official website 

Music magazines published in the United States
Quarterly magazines published in the United States
Magazines established in 2002
Magazines published in Los Angeles
Magazines disestablished in 2014
Defunct magazines published in the United States